Uz Maršala Tita is a Yugoslav Partisan anthem about the Marshal and president of SFR Yugoslavia Josip Broz Tito, written by Vladimir Nazor and composed by Oskar Danon.

During the Independent State of Croatia, part of the Ustasha ideology was minimizing the Slavic origin of Croats. One theory claimed that Croats and Goths shared a same origin. The middle stanza of this song addresses that by outright refutal of the Gothic theory and by reaffirming the Slavic origins of all South Slavs.

Written in 1943 when relations between Josip Broz Tito and the Soviet leadership were very close, the early version of the song included a mention of Joseph Stalin. The first verse of this early version read "Uz Tita, Staljina, dva junačka sina" (With Tito and Stalin, two heroic sons). After the Tito–Stalin split in 1948, Stalin's name was dropped and the first verse was changed to "Uz maršala Tita, junačkoga sina" (With marshal Tito, a heroic son). It has been translated into all official languages of SFR Yugoslavia, as well as Slovak (So Súdruhom Titom).

Lyrics

References

Yugoslav Partisan songs
Pan-Slavism
Propaganda songs
Songs about presidents
Cultural depictions of Josip Broz Tito
1940s songs
Year of song unknown